The 2013–14 SHL season was the 39th season of the Swedish Hockey League (SHL). The regular season began on 14 September 2013 and ended on 8 March 2014. The following playoffs began on 15 March 2014 and ended on 21 April 2014. It was the first season since the league changed name from Elitserien to Swedish Hockey League in June 2013.

Skellefteå AIK defended their 2013 Swedish Championship title by defeating Färjestad BK four games to zero in the Finals. Skellefteå AIK became the first team to defend the Swedish Championship title since Djurgårdens IF did so with their consecutive Swedish Championship titles in 2000 and 2001. Skellefteå AIK also became the first team since Brynäs IF in 1976–77 to win consecutive Swedish Championships by not losing a single game in both Finals series.

A number of format changes were introduced this season. Instead of the top eight teams in the regular season qualifying for the playoffs and the teams ranked 9–10 ending their season, the top six teams qualified for the playoffs directly, and the four teams ranked 7–10 played a best-of-three series and battled for the two remaining playoff spots. The two teams ranked 11–12 still had to play in the Kvalserien round-robin tournament in order to requalify for the SHL. Also, the top three teams no longer got to pick their opponents in the quarterfinals; instead, the first-ranked team faced the lowest-ranked winner of the two best-of-three series, the second-ranked team faced the other winner of the two best-of-three-series, the third-ranked team faced the sixth-ranked team, and the fourth-ranked team faced the fifth-ranked team.

In Kvalserien, Örebro HK requalified and Djurgårdens IF qualified for the 2014–15 SHL season at the expense of AIK.

Participating teams

League changes 
Similar to the system in the Finnish Liiga, only the top six teams qualified directly for the playoffs. The four teams ranked 7–10 played a best-of-three series, known as Play In, in order to qualify for the playoffs. The seventh-ranked team faced the tenth-ranked team and the eighth-ranked team faced the ninth-ranked team, with the better-ranked teams receiving home advantage in two games if necessary to determine a winner of the series. The winners of these two best-of-three series took the two remaining playoff spots. The teams ranked 11–12 were still forced to play in the Kvalserien in order to requalify for the next season of the SHL.

From this season, the ability for the top three teams to pick their opponents in the quarterfinals was dropped; instead, the first-ranked team faced the lowest-ranked winner of the two best-of-three series, the second-ranked team faced the other winner of the two best-of-three series, the third-ranked team faced the sixth-ranked team, and the fourth-ranked team faced the fifth-ranked team.

Summary 
This season's outdoor game was played on December 14, 2013, between Frölunda HC and Skellefteå AIK at Gamla Ullevi, Gothenburg. The game was won by Skellefteå 4–1 in front of 13,452 spectators. It was the second SHL outdoor game to be hosted in Gothenburg, Sweden's second largest city, as well as the second SHL outdoor game featuring Frölunda HC.

On February 8, 2014, Leksands IF defenceman Patrik Hersley scored his 22nd goal of the season. With this, he broke the previous record for the number of goals by a defenceman in an SHL regular season, set by Jan Huokko in the 1998–99 season with 21 goals. Hersley added another two goals to finish the regular season with 24 goals. He was awarded the Salming Trophy, as the SHL's best defenceman, for his performance.

Linköpings HC forward Pär Arlbrandt finished the season with 71 points, becoming the third player in league history (after Håkan Loob and Bud Holloway) to score 70 points in a regular season.

Regular season

Standings

Statistics

Scoring leaders 
 
List shows the ten best skaters based on the number of points during the regular season. If two or more skaters are tied (i.e. same number of points, goals and played games), all of the tied skaters are shown. Updated as of the end of the regular season.
GP = Games played; G = Goals; A = Assists; Pts = Points; +/– = Plus/minus; PIM = Penalty minutes

Leading goaltenders 
These are the leaders in GAA among goaltenders who played at least 40% of the team's minutes. The table is sorted by GAA, and the criteria for inclusion are bolded. Updated as of the end of the regular season.

GP = Games played; TOI = Time on ice (minutes); GA = Goals against; SO = Shutouts; Sv% = Save percentage; GAA = Goals against average

Captains and alternate captains

Playoffs 
This season, only the top six teams qualified directly for the playoffs. The four teams ranked 7–10 played a best-of-three series and battled for the two remaining playoff spots. Also, the top three teams no longer got to pick their opponents in the quarterfinals.

Play In 
The teams ranked 7 and 10, and the teams ranked 8 and 9, respectively, faced each other in a best-of-three series in order to qualify for the playoffs. The better-ranked teams in the two series received home advantage, i.e. two home games, if necessary to determine a winner of the series. The two winners, HV71 and Linköpings HC, took the two remaining playoff spots.

(7) Leksands IF vs. (10) HV71

(8) Modo Hockey vs. (9) Linköpings HC

Playoff bracket 
In the first round, the top-ranked team faced the lowest-ranked winner of the two best-of-three series, the second-ranked team faced the other winner of the two best-of-three series, the third-ranked team faced the sixth-ranked team, and the fourth-ranked team faced the fifth-ranked team. In the second round, the highest remaining seed was matched against the lowest remaining seed. In each round the higher-seeded team was awarded home advantage. Each series was a best-of-seven series that followed an alternating home team format: the higher-seeded team played at home for games 1 and 3 (plus 5 and 7 if necessary), and the lower-seeded team was at home for games 2 and 4 (plus 6 if necessary).

Quarterfinals

(1) Skellefteå AIK vs. (10) HV71

(2) Frölunda HC vs. (9) Linköpings HC

(3) Växjö Lakers vs. (6) Luleå HF

(4) Brynäs IF vs. (5) Färjestad BK

Semifinals

(1) Skellefteå AIK vs. (9) Linköpings HC

(3) Växjö Lakers vs. (5) Färjestad BK

Finals: (1) Skellefteå AIK vs. (5) Färjestad BK 
Skellefteå AIK made their fourth consecutive appearance in the Finals, following Finals appearances in 2011, 2012, and 2013. Färjestad BK reached the Finals for the first time since 2011, and became the first team seeded lower than fourth in the regular season to reach the Finals since sixth-seeded Modo Hockey made it to the Finals in 2000.

Skellefteå AIK swept Färjestad BK four games to zero and secured their third Swedish Championship title in club history, following titles in 1978 and 2013, the year before. Skellefteå AIK became the first team to defend the Swedish Championship title since Djurgårdens IF did so with their consecutive Swedish Championship titles in 2000 and 2001. Skellefteå AIK also became the first team since Brynäs IF in 1976–77 to win consecutive Swedish Championships by not losing a single game in both Finals series. Their 8–1 crush in game three marked the biggest goal margin (7 goals) in a single Finals game in SHL history. Over the four games, Skellefteå racked up the goal differential 20–3.

Statistics

Scoring leaders 
 
List shows the ten best skaters based on the number of points during the playoffs. If two or more skaters are tied (i.e. same number of points, goals and played games), all of the tied skaters are shown. Updated as of the end of the playoffs.
GP = Games played; G = Goals; A = Assists; Pts = Points; +/– = Plus/minus; PIM = Penalty minutes

Leading goaltenders 
These are the leaders in GAA and save percentage among goaltenders who played more than 40% of the team's minutes. The table is sorted by GAA, and the criteria for inclusion are bolded. Updated as of the end of the season.

GP = Games played; TOI = Time on ice (minutes); GA = Goals against; SO = Shutouts; Sv% = Save percentage; GAA = Goals against average

SHL awards

See also 
 2014 Kvalserien
 List of SHL seasons
 2013 in ice hockey
 2014 in ice hockey

References

External links

 
2013-14
1
Swe